The 2015 New South Wales Waratahs season was the club's 19th season since the inception of Super Rugby in 1996.

Players

Squad
The squad for the 2015 Super Rugby season

(c) Denotes team captain, Bold denotes player is internationally capped.

Transfers

Ins:

Outs:

Quick Summary

Standings

Detailed season summary

Regular season

Finals 
As the Waratahs came second on the overall standings, they directly qualified for the semi-finals bypassing the first week of qualifying finals.

References

External links
 Waratahs Official website
 Australia Super Rugby website
 SANZAR website

2015
2015 Super Rugby season by team
2015 in Australian rugby union